Markovka is a rural locality (a selo) and the administrative center of Markovsky Selsoviet of Klyuchevsky District, Altai Krai, Russia. The population was 284 as of 2014. There are 5 streets.

Geography 
Markovka is located 56 km northeast of Klyuchi (the district's administrative centre) by road. Zelyonaya Polyana is the nearest rural locality.

Ethnicity 
The village is inhabited by Ukrainians and others.

References 

Rural localities in Klyuchevsky District